Count Max (Italian:Il conte Max) is a 1957 Italian-Spanish comedy film directed by Giorgio Bianchi and starring Alberto Sordi, Vittorio De Sica and Anne Vernon. It is a remake of the 1937 film Il signor Max in which De Sica had played the title role. This film was itself remade in 1991.

A newspaper vendor masquerades as a count, falling in with a baroness and her wealthy, aristocratic friends. He believes he is love with her, but comes to realize he has more in common with her maid.

The film's art direction was by Flavio Mogherini.

Plot 
Alberto Boccetti, Roman newsagent in Via Veneto, is mistaken for Count Max Orsini Varaldo, a penniless nobleman and scrounger, while on vacation in Cortina (where he went instead of going on vacation to the village of Capracotta as desired by his uncle).

Here he meets Baroness Elena di Villombrosa, who invites him to join the company of nobles, headed to Seville, but also meets their housekeeper Lauretta. In Seville, after contracting debts to give orchids to the baroness, he is repatriated to Italy. Some time later, in Rome, while working in the newsstand, he meets Lauretta who is very surprised by the similarity between Alberto and Count Max. A series of transformations, in which Alberto wears the clothes of the count, who courts the baroness, and those of the newsagent, who make Lauretta suspicious, lead him to have to choose between living a rich life but not his own and another more normal one that belongs to him. The decision comes when he discovers the arrogant and humiliating way in which the nobles treat the beautiful and sweet Lauretta.

Cast
 Alberto Sordi as Alberto Boccetti  
 Vittorio De Sica as Conte Max Orsini Varaldo  
 Anne Vernon as Baroness Elena di Villombrosa  
 Susana Canales as Lauretta Campo  
 Tina Pica as La zia  
 Juan Calvo as Lo zio Giovanni  
 Jacinto San Emeterio as Don Juan de Figueroa  
 Diletta D'Andrea as Pucci - sorella di Elena  
 Mino Doro as Maj. Guido Amadori  
 Piero Stucchi as Giovanni Sampieri - 'Meme'  
 Antonella Florio as Patrizia  
 Alberto Craig as Stefano  
 Edy Biagetti as Gianluca  
 Nani Colombo as Nené 
 Edith Jost as La contessa  
 Luigi Mondello
 Julio Riscal as Paolino 
 Marco Tulli as Il sarto

References

Bibliography 
 Rémi Fournier Lanzoni.Comedy Italian style: the golden age of Italian film comedies. Continuum, 2008.

External links 
 

1957 films
Spanish comedy films
Italian comedy films
1950s Italian-language films
Films directed by Giorgio Bianchi
Remakes of Italian films
Films set in Italy
Films set in Spain
Films scored by Angelo Francesco Lavagnino
1950s Italian films
1950s Spanish films